Deh-e Seraj (also Romanized as Deh-e Serāj and Deh Serāj) is a village in Saadatabad Rural District, Pariz District, Sirjan County, Kerman Province, Iran. At the 2006 census, its population was 330, in 85 families.

References 

Populated places in Sirjan County